The RV  MTA Selen is a Turkish research vessel owned by the General Directorate of Mineral Research and Exploration (MTA) in Ankara and operated by its division of Geophysical Directorate for subsea geophysical exploration in shallow waters.

Characteristics
She was built in 2010 and commissioned in January 2011.

See also

List of research vessels of Turkey

References

2010 ships
Research vessels of Turkey